Don't Worry, We'll Think of a Title is a 1966 American comedy film directed by Harmon Jones and written by Morey Amsterdam, John Davis Hart, William Marks and George Schenck. The film stars Morey Amsterdam, Rose Marie, Richard Deacon, Joey Adams and Andy Albin. Besides the credited cast, there are uncredited cameo appearances by Steve Allen, Milton Berle, Carl Reiner, Irene Ryan, Danny Thomas, Forrest Tucker and others, as well as a non-Stooge appearance by Moe Howard. The film was released in May 1966, by United Artists.

Plot
Charlie Yuckapuck (Morey Amsterdam) and Annie (Rose Marie) work as a zany cook and waitress at the diner run by Mr. Travis (Richard Deacon), located across from a busy factory, visited by Danny Thomas, Forrest Tucker, Joe Ploski and other celebs in cameos.  Meanwhile, the Soviet KEB believes that Charlie is really defecting Soviet cosmonaut Yasha Nudnik, and sends Comrade Olga (Carmen Phillips) et al. to observe him, all members of a spy ring run by Mr. Big (Jack Heller). One day lawyer Crumworth Raines (Moe Howard) arrives and announces to waitress Magda Anders (January Jones) that she has inherited a bookstore at Updike University, causing Charlie and Annie to switch jobs to the bookstore, where undercover U.S. government agent Jim Holliston (Michael Ford) volunteers to help. Features a cameo by Irene Ryan as Granny, and Steve Allen, Milton Berle, and Carl Reiner as bookstore customers. Peggy Mondo, Cliff Arquette, and Nick Adams have cameos as KEB agents. Tim Herbert plays Samu, "Fastest Draw in the East".

Cast 
Morey Amsterdam as Charlie Yuckapuck
Rose Marie as Annie
Richard Deacon as Mr. Travis / Police Chief
Joey Adams as 1st Digger
Andy Albin as 2nd Digger
Henry Corden as Professor Lerowski
Michael Ford as Jim Holliston
Jack Heller as Mr. Big 
Tim Herbert as Seed / Samu
Peggy Mondo as Fat KEB agent
Carmen Phillips as Comrad Olga
January Jones as Magda Anders
Moe Howard as atty. Crumworth Raines
Danny Thomas as Diner Customer
Forrest Tucker as Romantic Diner Customer
Milton Berle as Bookstore Rope Customer
Irene Ryan as Granny
Steve Allen as Bookstore Customer
Cliff Arquette as KEB Agent
Carl Reiner as Bald Bookstore Customer
Nick Adams as KEB Agent

See also
List of American films of 1966

References

External links 
 
 
 

1966 comedy films
1966 films
American comedy films
American black-and-white films
Films directed by Harmon Jones
Films scored by Richard LaSalle
United Artists films
1960s English-language films
1960s American films